Fair Haven is a 2016 American independent drama film directed by Kerstin Karlhuber, written by Jack Bryant, produced by Tom Malloy, and starring Tom Wopat, Michael Grant, Gregory Harrison, Josh Green, and Lily Anne Harrison.

The film was released by Breaking Glass Pictures digitally and theatrically and it premiered on Showtime Networks in June 2017.

Premise 
A young man returns to his family farm, after a long stay in conversion therapy, and is torn between the expectations of his emotionally distant father and the memories of a past, loving relationship he has tried to bury.

Cast 
 Tom Wopat as Richard
 Michael Grant as James
 Gregory Harrison as Dr. Gallagher
 Josh Green as Charlie
 Lily Anne Harrison (Gregory Harrison's daughter) as Suzy
 Tom Malloy as Reverend Thomas
 Jennifer Taylor as Ruby
 Lisa Varga as Patricia
 Denise Dorado as Helena
 Michael Cuddire as Sebastian 
 Janne Herrington as Melissa

Production 
Although the film takes place in Vermont, it was shot on location in and around Rochester, New York, in June 2014.

Release 
Fair Haven premiered domestically at the Human Rights Campaign headquarters in Washington, D.C. in April 2016 before completing an extensive international festival run. The film's international premiere was in Turin, Italy in May 2016. An American theatrical release followed in March 2017 in Los Angeles. The film premiered on Showtime Networks in June 2017 and was also released digitally and on DVD by Breaking Glass Pictures. The film's sales agent is The Little Film Company. It continues to release internationally in foreign territories.

Reception 
Fair Haven was called a "bold new film" by The Huffington Post and "stirring, well acted, and tenderly wrought" by the Los Angeles Times. The film was also named a "Don't Miss Indie" by Film Independent.

References 
 LA Times Fair Haven Review 
 Washington Blade Human Rights Campaign Premiere Review
 Breaking Glass Acquires Fair Haven
 The Little Film Company Acquires International Rights to Fair Haven
 Huffington Post, "Bold new film"...
 Call Me Adam with Kerstin Karlhuber
 LA Splash AFM Debut
 The Ithacan with Jack Bryant
 Tom Wopat in Goliath
 Edge Media Fair Haven Review

External links 
 
 
 Rotten Tomatoes
 Metacritic

2016 films
2016 drama films
2016 LGBT-related films
American independent films
American drama films
American LGBT-related films
Films about conversion therapy
Gay-related films
2016 independent films
LGBT-related drama films
2010s English-language films
2010s American films